Holmium(III) sulfide is the sulfide of holmium, with the chemical formula of . Like other rare earth sulfides, it is used as a high-performance inorganic pigment.

Preparation 
Holmium(III) sulfide can be obtained by the reaction of holmium(III) oxide and hydrogen sulfide at 1325 °C.

Properties 
Holmium(III) sulfide has orange-yellow crystals in the monoclinic crystal system, with the space group  P21/m (No. 11). Under high pressure, holmium(III) sulfide can form in the cubic and orthorhombic crystal systems.

References 

Holmium compounds
Sulfides